The 1999–2000 Macedonian First League was the 8th season of the Macedonian First Football League, the highest football league of Macedonia. The first matches of the season were played on 15 August 1999 and the last on 28 May 2000. Sloga Jugomagnat defended their championship title, having won their second title in a row.

Promotion and relegation

Participating teams

League table

Results

Top goalscorers

Source: Top15goalscorers.blogspot.com

See also
1999–2000 Macedonian Football Cup
1999–2000 Macedonian Second Football League

External links
Macedonia - List of final tables (RSSSF)
Football Federation of Macedonia

Macedonia
1
Macedonian First Football League seasons